Blanchard is a French family name.

Blanchard may also refer to:

 Blanchard (crater), a lunar crater that lies on the far side of the Moon
Blanchardstown, a suburb of Dublin, Ireland, where many office parks are situated
Blanchard Glacier, a glacier flowing into Wilhelmina Bay between Garnerin Point and Sadler Point, on the west coast of Graham Land
Blanchard Hill, a hill between Mount Kelsey and Whymper Spur in the Pioneers Escarpment, eastern Shackleton Range
Blanchard Nunataks, an east–west trending group of nunataks, about 16 miles long, marking the south end of the Gutenko Mountains in central Palmer Land
Blanchard Ridge, a rocky ridge, 520 metres (1,700 ft) high, at the north side of the mouth of Wiggins Glacier on Kiev Peninsula on the west coast of Graham Land
Mount Raoul Blanchard, the highest peak in the Laurentian Mountains, Quebec, Canada
Village-Blanchard, New Brunswick, a settlement in New Brunswick, Canada

United States
 Blanchard, California
 Blanchard, Delaware
 Blanchard, Iowa
 Blanchard, Louisiana
 Blanchard, Maine
 Blanchard, Michigan
 Blanchard, Missouri
 Blanchard, North Dakota
 Blanchard, Ohio
 Blanchard, Oklahoma
 Blanchard, Allegheny County, Pennsylvania
 Blanchard, Centre County, Pennsylvania
 Blanchard, Texas
 Blanchard, Wisconsin
 Blanchard Dam, a dam across the Mississippi River near the city of Royalton, Minnesota
 Blanchard Hall, a building located on the campus of Wheaton College in Wheaton, Illinois
 Blanchard House (Boyce, Louisiana)
 Blanchard House (Syracuse, New York)
 Blanchard Island, an island in the Mississippi River between the U.S. states of Illinois and Iowa
 Blanchard River, a tributary of the Auglaize River in northwestern Ohio
 Blanchard Springs Caverns, a cave system located in the Ozark National Forest in Stone County in northern Arkansas
 Blanchard Township, Hancock County, Ohio, one of the seventeen townships of Hancock County, Ohio
 Blanchard Township, Hardin County, Ohio, one of the fifteen townships of Hardin County, Ohio
 Blanchard Township, Putnam County, Ohio, one of the fifteen townships of Putnam County, Ohio
 Blanchard-Upton House, a historic house at 62 Osgood Street in Andover, Massachusetts
 Fourth and Blanchard Building, a skyscraper in Seattle, Washington
 Mount Blanchard, Ohio, a village in Hancock County, Ohio
 Ora Blanchard House, an historic house in Stratton, Maine
 [Blanchard Hall], a building on the campus of Mount Holyoke College, S. Hadley, Massachusetts

See also
 20230 Blanchard (1997 XH5), a main-belt asteroid discovered in 1997 by the OCA-DLR Asteroid Survey at Caussols
 Blanchard Springs Caverns, a cave system in the Ozark National Forest in northern Arkansas
 Blanchard's transsexualism typology, a psychological typology of gender dysphoria, transsexualism, and fetishistic transvestism
 Faulkner-Blanchard, a brass era automobile manufactured in Detroit, Michigan by the Faulkner-Blanchard Motor Car Company in 1910
 Hersey-Blanchard situational theory, a leadership theory conceived by Paul Hersey and Ken Blanchard
 Société des Avions Blanchard, a French aircraft manufacturer